The Maelstrom is a 1917 silent film drama directed by Paul Scardon. It stars Dorothy Kelly, Earle Williams and Julia Swayne Gordon. Thomas Ince produced along with the Vitagraph Company.

Cast
Dorothy Kelly – Peggy Greye-Stratton
Earle Williams – Jimmie Hallet
Julia Swayne Gordon – Gwennie Lyne
Gordon Gray – Cincinnati Red
Bernard Siegel – Dago Sam
Denton Vane – Ling
John S. Robertson
Robert Gaillard
Frank Crayne

Preservation status
A print is preserved in the Library of Congress collection Packard Campus for Audio-Visual Conservation.

References

External links
The Maelstrom at IMDb.com

1917 films
American silent feature films
Vitagraph Studios films
American black-and-white films
Silent American drama films
1917 drama films
Films directed by Paul Scardon
1910s American films